Lev Baklyshkin (24 September 1933 – 28 July 2011) was a Soviet equestrian. He competed at the 1956 Summer Olympics and the 1960 Summer Olympics.

References

External links
 

1933 births
2011 deaths
Russian male equestrians
Soviet male equestrians
Olympic equestrians of the Soviet Union
Equestrians at the 1956 Summer Olympics
Equestrians at the 1960 Summer Olympics
Sportspeople from Moscow